The Oman national beach soccer team represents Oman in international beach soccer competitions and is controlled by the Oman Football Association, the governing body for football in Oman.

Results and fixtures

The following is a list of match results in the last 12 months, as well as any future matches that have been scheduled.

Legend

2021

Coaching staff

Current coaching staff

Coach: Talib Al Thanawi

Manager history

Talib Al Thanawi

Players

Current squad
The following players and staff members were called up for the 2021 FIFA Beach Soccer World Cup.

Head coach: Talib Hilal Mohammed Al Thanawi
Goalkeeping coach: Yusuf Abeid Khatibu

Competitive record

FIFA Beach Soccer World Cup

References

External links
Squad

Asian national beach soccer teams
Beach Soccer